Li Shida, was a Chinese painter of the Ming dynasty. A native of Suzhou, Jiangsu Province, he obtained the position of a jinshi in the imperial examination in 1574 during the reign of the Wanli Emperor.

Biography 
Li was born at a year around 1540. He grew up in Xingguo.

Painting 
Shida painted figures and landscape paintings. He also did flower painting (which he claimed he wasn't good at.

He wrote an essay on five qualities he believed helped him paint. He claimed they were ability, sincerity, rarity, depth and harmony.

References 

Painters from Suzhou
16th-century births
Ming dynasty painters
Year of death unknown